Thomas Williamson, Baron Williamson,  (2 September 1897 – 27 February 1983) was a British trade unionist and Labour Party politician.

Williamson was born in St. Helens, Lancashire. His father was a glassblower, and Tom began his career working in the office of his father's union, the National Amalgamated Union of Labour.  He became a full-time union delegate, and in 1924, when it became part of the National Union of General and Municipal Workers (NUGMW), he was appointed as a district secretary. He became interested in politics at age 9, when his father took him to see Tom Mann speak. During the First World War, he served with the Royal Engineers.

He first foray into politics was serving on the Liverpool City Council from 1929 to 1935. At the 1945 general election, he was elected as Member of Parliament (MP) for the Brigg constituency in Lincolnshire. He resigned his seat in 1948, and the resulting by-election was won by Labour's Lance Mallalieu.

In 1937, he became the industrial officer of NUGMW, and served as its General Secretary from 1946 to 1961. He was also President of the Trades Union Congress from 1957 to 1958. He was a founding member of the British Productivity Council.

Williamson was appointed a Commander of the Order of the British Empire (CBE) in 1950, and was knighted in 1956.

Williamson was created a life peer on 15 May 1962, with the title Baron Williamson, of Eccleston in the Borough of St. Helens in the County Palatine of Lancaster.

He died in a Cheshire nursing home in 1983, aged 85. He was survived by his wife, Hilda Hartley, whom he married in 1925. They had one daughter.

References

External links 
 
 

1897 births
1983 deaths
British trade union leaders
Commanders of the Order of the British Empire
GMB (trade union)-sponsored MPs
Labour Party (UK) MPs for English constituencies
UK MPs 1945–1950
UK MPs who were granted peerages
Members of the General Council of the Trades Union Congress
General Secretaries of the GMB (trade union)
Presidents of the Trades Union Congress
Labour Party (UK) life peers
Knights Bachelor
Life peers created by Elizabeth II